Qurigol Rural District is in the Central District of Bostanabad County, East Azerbaijan province, Iran. At the census of 2006, its population was 10,903 in 2,593 households; there were 10,520 inhabitants in 2,933 households at the following census of 2011; and in the most recent census of 2016, the population of the rural district was 9,814 in 2,926 households. The largest of its 17 villages was Alanaq, with 3,646 people.

References 

Bostanabad County

Rural Districts of East Azerbaijan Province

Populated places in East Azerbaijan Province

Populated places in Bostanabad County